Almas Tower ( Diamond Tower) is a 68-storey, supertall skyscraper in the Jumeirah Lakes Towers, Dubai, United Arab Emirates. Construction of the office building began in early 2005 and was completed in 2008 with the installation of some remaining cladding panels at the top of the tower. The building was topped out in 2008, and became the tallest building in Dubai until 2009 when it was surpassed by Burj Khalifa.

Construction
Almas Tower is located on its own artificial island in the centre of the Jumeirah Lake Towers Free Zone scheme, the tallest of all the buildings on the development. It was designed by Atkins Middle East, who designed most of the JLT Free Zone complex. The tower was constructed by the Taisei Corporation of Japan in a joint venture with Arabian Construction Co. (ACC) who were awarded the contract by Nakheel Properties on 16 July 2005.

Building Usage

The Dubai Multi Commodities Centre (DMCC), the developer of the tower, was the first to move in. The DMCC moved its corporate offices along with the Dubai Diamond Exchange, to the unfinished tower on 15 November 2008. Almas Tower now houses facilities that provide a wide range of services for the region’s diamond, coloured gemstones and pearl industries. Along with the Dubai Diamond Exchange, these include the Dubai Gems Club, the Dubai Pearl Exchange, the Kimberley Process Certification offices and access to secure transportation agencies such as Brinks and Transguard, in addition to networking and meeting rooms. Diamond cutting and exchange take place at the tower. Due to the type of transactions taking place at the tower, high security is installed. Almas Tower ranked 8th in the 2009 Emporis Skyscraper Awards.

Incidents 
On 22 April 2018, a fire broke out in Almas Tower and all residents were evacuated, no reported injuries according to the reports of Dubai Civil Defence.

See also
 List of tallest buildings in Dubai
 List of tallest buildings in the United Arab Emirates

References

External links 
 DMCC entry
 Faithful+Gould Middle East & India
 Almas Tower
Emirates

Office buildings completed in 2009
Architecture in Dubai
Futurist architecture
High-tech architecture
Postmodern architecture
Skyscraper office buildings in Dubai
2009 establishments in the United Arab Emirates